Brighto Paints is a Pakistani paints manufacturing company headquartered in Lahore, Pakistan. Its products include basic and industrial chemicals, decorative paints, industrial (re)finishing products, coatings etc.

In 2012, Brighto Paints was awarded the International Quality Crown Award in the Gold Category in London. In 2021, the company was announced to be the title sponsor of a test series between South Africa and Pakistan.

References

Chemical companies of Pakistan
Manufacturing companies based in Lahore
Pakistani brands
Chemical companies established in 1973
Paint manufacturers
Pakistani companies established in 1973